Conservative Friends are members of a certain branch of the Religious Society of Friends (Quakers). In the United States of America, Conservative Friends belong to three Yearly Meetings, Ohio, North Carolina, and Iowa. English Friends affiliated with the Conservative branch tend to use the term Primitive, or (less frequently) Plain. There is no single unifying association of Conservative Friends, unlike three of the other branches of Quakerism in America, represented by Friends United Meeting, Evangelical Friends International, and Friends General Conference.

Characteristics of Conservative Friends 

Conservative Friends are often seen as occupying a middle ground between the theologically liberal wing and the evangelical wing of the Society of Friends.  Their origin is found in early 19th-century schisms, first with liberal, "Hicksite" Friends and then with evangelical-oriented "Gurneyite" Friends. In the latter schism, what are now called Conservative Friends were known as "Wilburite".  Through the schisms, they sought continuity of traditional practices and theological emphases, over new ideas based on outside influences.

These Friends have tended to follow the overt customs of plain speech and dress more than other branches of the Society of Friends. While a minority of Conservative Friends wear traditional plain dress (it is not mandated), they are most associated today with that traditional Quaker folkway. Conservative Friends also maintain the type of business meeting which was in use among all branches of Friends until the middle of the twentieth century.

Each Yearly Meeting publishes a small book called The Discipline which includes the polity and beliefs of the body. This book is called by the more progressive members Faith and Practice, following the late-twentieth century example of liberal yearly meetings. The Discipline includes provisions for business organization; the naming of ministers, elders, and overseers; marriage procedures; and the Advices and Queries. The Queries are read on the local monthly meeting level, with the next higher levels (Quarterly and Yearly Meetings) summarizing the answers from the subordinate meetings.

The Hicksite–Orthodox schism 

Friends in the United States became divided during the early years of the nineteenth century.

In the mid-1820s, wealthy Friends in leadership positions in Quaker organizations in Philadelphia began to "express disunity" (openly disagree) with the ministry of Elias Hicks, a rural traveling minister from Long Island, New York, whose ministry emphasized direct experience of God over reliance on scripture. Hicks himself was concerned that urban, successful and wealthy Friends particularly in Philadelphia but also in the United Kingdom had strayed from the testimonies and early practices of Friends.  Of particular concern to Hicksite Friends was the adoption of Protestant notions of the authority of scripture over the Light of the Inward Christ, endorsement of justification and sanctification over the more traditional Quaker sense of gradual convincement, and the use of Trinitarian language.

Also of concern for both sides was the relative authority of the Yearly Meeting (favored by the Orthodox) and the Monthly Meetings (favored by Hicksite Friends).  Hicks, who like his followers was from rural farming stock, was adamant that Friends stay a "peculiar people" behind the "hedge" of Quaker plainness while the Orthodox Friends were eager to integrate with modern urban society. Both groups were active in traditional Friends social justice movements, such as the abolition of slavery and right ordered care for the mentally ill.

Orthodox Friends ministers, Joseph Hoag and Stephen Grellet,  spoke widely about statements made by Hicks in ministry which suggested that portions of the Bible were not accurate, particularly Hicks's view that the virgin birth was historically suspect and not necessary to salvation. Hicks always maintained that he spoke the words given him by God in what Friends called immediate revelation much as did the early Friends, but this proved unacceptable to Orthodox Quakers drawn to Protestant forms. Hicksite Quakers left PYM (1827–28) to form a new Yearly Meeting, with other yearly meetings soon to follow in division.

Many scholars have written about various aspects of these controversies. A good short summary is Larry Kuenning's "Quaker Theologies in the 19th Century Separations", but for more depth, see H. Larry Ingle, Quakers in Conflict: The Hicksite Reformation (Philadelphia: Pendle Hill, 1998).

Second (Gurneyite–Wilburite) separation 
Within a decade, a rift was beginning to divide the Orthodox coalition. Most ministers and elders were placing additional emphasis upon the writings of the earliest Friends (called at the time the "primitive" Friends), while other Friends were becoming influenced by the growing Evangelical movement, in particular a group of British Friends ministers associated to varying degrees with Isaac Crewdson and the Beacon movement which began in 1830 in England.

The ministers and elders who emphasized the "primitive" Friends testimony became increasingly uneasy with the growing Evangelically-oriented ministry. The first official action in the movement took place when Elisha Bates, a former Clerk of Ohio Yearly Meeting, travelled to England without the official credentials (an endorsed travelling minute). On this trip, Bates participated in a baptism ceremony. (Quakers had avoided external rites like baptism and eucharist/communion.) When he returned to Ohio, he was not only "read out of meeting" (stripped of his membership), he was disowned by the Friends (a public declaration of removal from membership). One of the evangelical English ministers, Joseph John Gurney, travelled to America to support Bates and to meet with Hicksite Friends.

Instead of healing the wounds, Gurney's visit exacerbated the growing rift among the Orthodox Friends. Gurney believed that the position of the scriptures had been lowered too much among Friends; although he did not totally discount the influence or necessity of the Holy Spirit, Gurney placed the two as separate influences. He encouraged Friends to participate in government, including voting in elections (at the time, most Friends did not participate in politics). Gurney had decided as a young man not to wear the traditional Quaker clothing, stating once that he only wore a broad-brimmed hat one day of his life. He was a powerful minister and a prolific writer. Travelling among Orthodox Friends at a time when ministers were considered to be examples for the youth, he provided an example which was troubling to those Friends who were dedicated to the "primitive" movement.

During Gurney's visit to North America in 1837–1838, there was opposition to his ministry throughout the Orthodox yearly meetings. A minister-schoolteacher in Rhode Island, John Wilbur, objected to Gurney's use of the early Wesleyan understanding of sanctification, which did not include the continual and daily interaction with the Holy Spirit for a growth in grace. Wilbur wrote an anonymous article that argued for the "primitive" Quaker understanding of continual interaction with the Spirit. Thomas B. Gould, another Friend from Newport, RI, also spoke with Gurney during his visit and outlined where his views departed from those of the early Friends. Other opposition to Gurney was based in the two Orthodox yearly meetings already known for their stand on the importance of an inward transformation (Ohio and Philadelphia).

The first division between the so-called Wilburite and Gurneyite Friends took place in Rhode Island in 1842. When the pro-Gurney majority of the Orthodox yearly meeting objected to Wilbur's writings about Gurney, they re-organized the structure of Friends meetings in western Rhode Island and stripped Wilbur of his membership. When Wilbur appealed his disownment, his quarterly meeting divided. New England Yearly Meeting (Orthodox) was unable to decide which quarterly meeting to recognize, which precipitated a division throughout all of New England.

The Wilbur-Gurney divisions continued for 15 years. New York Yearly Meeting (Orthodox) divided in 1847, and a Wilbur-influenced body was formed in Indiana. The major event in the divisions, however, was the division in Ohio Yearly Meeting (Orthodox) in 1854. This event led to divisions in Baltimore and Iowa later in 1854.

Philadelphia Yearly Meeting (Orthodox) initially recognized the Wilburite New England Yearly Meeting but later ended all official relations with other yearly meetings (including New England)  in order to prevent its small Gurneyite minority from leaving. However, Philadelphia's Haverford College continued to educate Conservative Friends as other Quaker colleges (except for the Hicksite Swarthmore) were under the care of Gurneyite yearly meetings.

Conservative Friends in the twentieth century 

By 1905, there were seven Conservative Friends Yearly Meetings left in America and Canada as well as an unaffiliated but Conservative-leaning Orthodox meeting in Philadelphia.  Of these, two have been laid down (Kansas Yearly Meeting, and Western Yearly Meeting) and two reunited with Gurneyite yearly meetings and Hicksite yearly meetings (Canada and New England); the undivided Philadelphia Yearly Meeting reunited with its Hicksite counterpart. In addition, most Primitive Friends communities at the beginning of the twentieth century in New York, New England, and Pennsylvania, had merged into other Quaker bodies by 1955. According to a website representing "Friends in Christ... a small group of Primitive Friends (Plain Quakers)" "plain" Quakers can today be found in the United Kingdom, in addition to some other countries."  Ripley Quaker Meeting is a small group of conservative Friends also located in the UK, who follow Ohio Yearly Meeting's Book of Discipline.

In the USA, three Conservative Friends Yearly Meetings remain as distinct Conservative Friends bodies in Ohio, North Carolina and Iowa; with Ohio Yearly Meeting (Conservative) being the most traditional Christian in belief and practice, of the three Conservative Friends Yearly Meetings; A small Conservative Friends remnant continues in some of the united yearly meetings (Canada and New England). In Europe, there are Conservative Quaker groups in the United Kingdom, while individual members reside in other countries too.

, the Ohio Yearly Meeting includes affiliated local meetings in Michigan, Ohio, Pennsylvania, Virginia, West Virginia, and Athens, Greece. The Iowa Yearly Meeting includes affiliated local meetings in Iowa, Minnesota, Missouri, Nebraska, South Dakota, and Wisconsin

See also
Whittier Friends Meeting House, Whittier, Iowa, historic meetinghouse of a Conservative Wilburite Friends group

References 

Cooper, Wilmer.  Growing Up Plain Among Conservative Wilburite Quakers: The Journey of a Public Friend.  Friends United Press, 1991.  
Friends Around the World, FWCC, 2010 Edition.

External links 

Conservative Friends links
Ohio Yearly Meeting (Conservative)
North Carolina Yearly Meeting (Conservative)
Iowa Yearly Meeting (Conservative)
Quaker Jane
A Short History of Conservative Friends
A Brief Synopsis of the Principles and Testimonies of the Religious Society of Friends (A Conservative Friends Statement of Faith of 1912)
The Conservative Friend: - A Christian Ministry of Ohio Conservative Friends
Friends of Jesus Fellowship
Friends in Christ
Digital Quaker Collection: – A List of Christian Quaker literature
Post Reformation Digital Library: – A Library of Early Modern Quaker texts

New Foundation Fellowship
New Foundation Fellowship

Conservative